Parthiban Shanmugam is a writer and director experienced in theater, video and film projects. He has performed and won several awards worldwide at festivals and theaters.  He trained as a defense and Strategic analyst, lawyer, human rights advocate, stand up comic and story teller. He has focused his career on the emerging south Asian culture in the USA. Shanmugam has been exposed to variety of creative influences from modern western art, eastern philosophy to literature, Hollywood and Bollywood.

Production, direction and cinematography
  That 47 days (2010) as producer, director and writer
  War Within Us (2009) as producer, director, writer and cinematographer
  The Ballad of Robert & Haevey aka We Are Not Far Away (2009)  as producer, director, writer and cinematographer
  Osama, Obama, and Parthiban (2009)  as producer, director, writer and cinematographer
  Even the cactus goes to Heaven (2008)  as producer, director, writer and cinematographer
  You're Rejected (2008) as producer, director, writer and cinematographer 
  A Pizza Story  (2007) as producer, director, writer
  Black Men Can Swim (2007) as producer, writer (screenplay and story)
  Black Men Can't Swim (2007) as director
  Downtime (2007) (V) as producer and first assistant director
  The Celestial Brides (2006) as producer, director and writer
  Mathamma (2006) as producer, director and writer

Acting
He acted in:
  That 47 days (2010)
  Osama, Obama, and Parthiban (2009)
  The Great New Wonderful (2005)
  The Ballad of Robert & Haevey aka We Are Not Far Away (2009)

References 

Living people
Year of birth missing (living people)
Place of birth missing (living people)
American male writers
American film directors
American male film actors
American cinematographers
American film producers
21st-century American male actors